Mortal Kombat is a video game franchise originally developed and produced by Midway Games. The video games are a series of fighting games and several action-adventure games which debuted in North American arcades on October 8, 1992 with the release of Mortal Kombat, created by Ed Boon and John Tobias. Mortal Kombat titles have been released on numerous different video game consoles, handheld game consoles, and personal computer platforms and is considered one of the best-selling video game franchises of all time with over 26 million games sold. The games have appeared on every major video game console produced since its debut including every console created by Sony and Microsoft, every console produced by Sega since the Sega Genesis (as well as the Master System in Europe and South America), and every console produced by Nintendo, bar the Wii U, since the Super NES.

Since their release many of the video games have been re-released on multiple platforms or included as part of compilation packages. The characters have also made cameo appearances in several other games. The video game series includes 24 differently named games, eleven of which are original fighting games, three of which are action-adventure games, and ten others which are re-releases, upgrades and ports. Along with the video game series two feature films, an animated and live-action television series, two books, and several comic books have been produced for the franchise. The first feature film was considered a major success and grossed roughly $70 million in the United States, and an estimated $122 million worldwide.

Video games

Main series

Spin-offs

Updated versions

Compilations and bundles

Films and television

Printed media

Novels

Comics

Music

Collectible card games

References

Mortal Kombat
Mortal Kombat
Mortal Kombat